The Streets Made Me is the second studio album by American rapper Soulja Slim, released by No Limit Records and Priority Records on July 24, 2001. The album wasn't as successful as his previous album. It was his last release with No Limit Records, released on independent outlet No Limit South. It features guest appearances from  Slay Sean, Krazy & Traci among others. Soulja Slim soon left to start his own label, Cut Throat Committee.

Track listing

References

Soulja Slim albums
2001 albums
No Limit Records albums